Warblewko  (German Neu Warbelow) is a village in the administrative district of Gmina Słupsk, within Słupsk County, Pomeranian Voivodeship, in northern Poland.

The village has a population of 31.

References

Warblewko